Faerie Glen is a large suburb of the city of Pretoria, South Africa. It is a well-developed area, lying to the east of the city centre.

When it was first established in 1974, it was the most eastern suburb of Pretoria, but the city has since considerably expanded eastwards and southwards.

References

Suburbs of Pretoria